Matthew James "Matty" Hatton (born 15 May 1981) is a British former professional boxer who competed from 2000 to 2013. He held the European welterweight title from 2010 to 2011, and challenged once for the WBC light-middleweight title in the latter year. He is the younger brother of former two-division world champion of boxing, Ricky Hatton, and fought on the undercard of many of Ricky's high-profile fights.

Biography
Hatton was born in Stockport, Greater Manchester, England, to Ray and Carol. Before becoming a professional boxer, Hatton worked for the family carpet business as a carpet fitter. He and his girlfriend Jenna Coyne have a son named Jack, who was born in 2008 and a daughter named Lola born in 2012. Unlike his brother Ricky, dad Ray, and the majority of his family who are supporters of Manchester City, Matthew supports Manchester United.

Amateur 
Hatton began boxing at the age of 12, and had 22 amateur contests, winning 18.

Professional boxing career
Hatton's career as a professional boxer began in late 2000 with a point's victory over David White, on the undercard of brother Ricky's fight with Giuseppe Lauri. Hatton was undefeated in his first 13 fights before a point's loss to journeyman David Kirk in 2003. In 2004, Hatton went on to defeat Robert Burton to win the British Central Area welterweight title, and six months later defeated the same man to claim the light middleweight version of the title.

British Title 
On 20 October 2006, Hatton was disqualified for low blows in the tenth and final round of a British Welterweight title eliminator against Alan Bosworth. Victory may well have given Hatton a shot at the British Welterweight title which was held at the time by Scottish boxer Kevin Anderson.

In 2007, Hatton won the IBF International welterweight title by defeating American Frank Houghtaling, and in his next fight defeated Puerto Rican Edwin Vazquez to win the IBF Inter-Continental title. Both fights were held in Las Vegas, Nevada on the undercard of Ricky Hatton's fights with Juan Urango and José Luis Castillo.

Commonwealth Title 
On 28 May 2008, Hatton lost to Craig Watson on a points decision with scores of 116–112, 117–112 and 118–111 in a challenge for the Commonwealth welterweight championship. The fight was held at the City of Manchester Stadium on the undercard of Ricky Hatton's fight with Juan Lazcano.

A short time after his loss to Watson, Hatton decided to leave long-time trainer Billy Graham and his Phoenix Camp Gym. Hatton would go on to be trained at Bobby Rimmer's Boxing Academy based in Stalybridge under the guidance of Lee Beard, who is also assistant trainer to Ricky Hatton.

Hatton vs. Ben Tackie 
Hatton fought former World title challenger Ben Tackie on the undercard of Ricky Hatton's fight with Paul Malignaggi at the MGM Grand, Las Vegas on 22 November 2008. Tackie was defeated by Matthew Hatton over 12 rounds in December 2003. Hatton defeated Tackie via a convincing unanimous decision with scores of 98–92, 98–92 and 97–93 in a performance which has been described as the best of his career.

Hatton vs. Bami
On 28 March 2009, Hatton defeated Ted Bami via a 6th round stoppage in an eliminator for the IBO welterweight Title.

Hatton vs. N'dou
Hatton was scheduled to fight Zab Judah on 19 September 2009 at the MGM Grand arena in a welterweight bout as part of the undercard of the Mayweather-Marquez fight. This fight was postponed due to the main bout being postponed owing to a rib injury to Mayweather.  Instead Hatton fought Lovemore N'dou for the IBO Welterweight title at Fenton Manor in Stoke-on-Trent on 13 November 2009, the contest was scored a draw.

Hatton vs. Branco
Hatton claimed the vacant European welterweight title with a unanimous points win over Gianluca Branco in Dagenham on 26 March 2010. Branco, having only lost twice previous to this fight (against Arturo Gatti & Miguel Cotto), came into the fight as Hatton's toughest test to date. Branco caught Hatton with a right hand in the first round which seemed to have him hurt, but Hatton overcame it and went on to claim the decision, allowing him to fully escape older brother Ricky's shadow and become "The European Welterweight Champion Of The World".

Hatton vs. Álvarez

In March 2011, Hatton lost to Canelo Álvarez in a bid for the WBC light-middleweight title.  The bigger and stronger Alvarez was docked a point in round seven ultimately leading to all three judges scoring the bout at 119–108 in favor of Alvarez.

Hatton vs. Brook
In March 2012, Hatton lost to undefeated Kell Brook in an all-British clash at the Motorpoint Arena in Sheffield. The quicker, more technically astute Brook outclassed Hatton over 12 rounds, and won the fight via a Unanimous Decision.

Hatton vs. Lomax
In October 2012, Hatton won a 1st-round knockout to journeyman Michael Lomax. It was a comeback bout after his disappointing defeat to Kell Brook, and a determined Hatton took the fight easily.

Hatton vs. Van Heerden
In his first fight of the year in February 2013, Hatton lost a unanimous decision to IBO Welterweight champion Chris Van Heerden. The South African outclassed him throughout with a smarter skillset that may have shattered future title hopes for the British boxer.

Championships held
 IBF Inter-Continental Welterweight title
 IBF International Welterweight title
 British Central Area Welterweight title
 British Central Area Light-Middleweight title
 European Welterweight title

Professional boxing record

| style="text-align:center;" colspan="8"|43 Wins (17 knockouts, 25 decisions),  7 Losses, 2 Draws
|-
|align=center style="border-style: none none solid solid; background: #e3e3e3"|Res.
|align=center style="border-style: none none solid solid; background: #e3e3e3"|Record
|align=center style="border-style: none none solid solid; background: #e3e3e3"|Opponent
|align=center style="border-style: none none solid solid; background: #e3e3e3"|Type
|align=center style="border-style: none none solid solid; background: #e3e3e3"|Rd., Time
|align=center style="border-style: none none solid solid; background: #e3e3e3"|Date
|align=center style="border-style: none none solid solid; background: #e3e3e3"|Location
|align=center style="border-style: none none solid solid; background: #e3e3e3"|Notes
|-align=center
|Loss
|43-7-2
|align=left|
|
|12 
|
|align=left|
|align=left|
|-align=center
|Loss
|43-6-2
|align=left|
|
|12 
|
|align=left|
|align=left|
|-align=center
|Loss
|43-5-2
|align=left|
|
|12 
|
|align=left|
|align=left|
|-align=center
|Win
|43-4-2
|align=left|
|
|1 
|
|align=left|
|align=left|
|-align=center
|Win
|42-4-2
|align=left|
|
|12 
|
|align=left|
|align=left|
|-align=center
|Win
|41-4-2
|align=left|
|
|12 
|
|align=left|
|align=left|
|-align=center
|Win
|40-4-2
|align=left|
|
|5 2:35
|
|align=left|
|align=left|
|-align=center
|style="background: #dddddd"|Draw
|39-4-2
|align=left|
|
|12 
|
|align=left| Fenton Manor Sports Complex, Stoke, Staffordshire, England
|align=left|
|-align=center
|Win
|39-4-1
|align=left| Ernesto Zepeda
|UD
|8 
|2009-05-02
|align=left| MGM Grand, Las Vegas, Nevada, United States
|align=left|
|-align=center
|Win
|38-4-1
|align=left| Ted Bami
|TKO
|6 2:03
|2009-03-28
|align=left| Leisure Centre, Altrincham, Greater Manchester, England
|align=left|
|-align=center
|Win
|37-4-1
|align=left| Ben Tackie
|UD
|10 
|2008-11-22
|align=left| MGM Grand, Las Vegas, Nevada, United States
|align=left|
|-align=center
|Win
|36-4-1
|align=left| Scott Woolford
|MD
|8 
|2008-09-05
|align=left| Harvey Hadden Leisure Centre, Nottingham, Nottinghamshire, England
|align=left|
|-align=center
|Loss
|35-4-1
|align=left| Craig Watson
|UD
|12 
|2008-05-24
|align=left| City of Manchester Stadium, Manchester, England
|align=left|
|-align=center
|Win
|35-3-1
|align=left| Frankie Santos
|UD
|8 
|2007-12-08
|align=left| MGM Grand, Las Vegas, Nevada, United States
|align=left|
|-align=center
|Win
|34-3-1
|align=left| Samuli Leppiaho
|RTD
|6 3:00
|2007-10-20
|align=left| National Stadium, Dublin, Ireland
|align=left|
|-align=center
|Win
|33-3-1
|align=left| Edwin Vazquez
|UD
|12 
|2007-06-23
|align=left| Thomas & Mack Center, Las Vegas, Nevada, United States
|align=left|
|-align=center
|Win
|32-3-1
|align=left| Frank Houghtaling
|RTD
|7 3:00
|2007-01-20
|align=left| Paris Las Vegas, Las Vegas, Nevada, United States
|align=left|
|-align=center
|Win
|31-3-1
|align=left| Volodymyr Borovskyi
|MD
|6 
|2006-12-10
|align=left| Octagon Centre, Sheffield, Yorkshire, England
|align=left|
|-align=center

See also
List of European Boxing Union welterweight champions
List of boxing families#Hatton family

References

External links

Matthew Hatton profile from Ricky Hatton's official website

1981 births
Living people
English male boxers
Sportspeople from Stockport
Welterweight boxers
People from Hyde, Greater Manchester